Dick Smith may refer to:

Sportspeople

American football
Dick Smith (offensive lineman) (1912–1980), offensive lineman in the NFL
Dick Smith (defensive back) (1944–?), defensive back in the NFL
Dick Smith (tackle), All-American football player for the University of Minnesota

Association football (soccer)
Dick Smith (footballer, died 1909), English football player for Manchester United
Dick Smith (footballer, born 1877) (1877–1959), English football player for Burnley
Dick Smith (footballer, born 1889) (1889–1939), English football player for Stoke

Baseball
Dick Smith (third baseman) (born 1927), MLB third baseman with the Pittsburgh Pirates
Dick Smith (NL outfielder) (1939–2012), MLB outfielder with the Los Angeles Dodgers and New York Mets
Dick Smith (AL outfielder) (born 1944), MLB outfielder with the Washington Senators

Other sports
Dick Smith (boxer) (1886–1950), British boxer
Dick Smith (rugby league), New Zealand rugby league player

Others 
Dick Smith (entrepreneur) (born 1944), Australian serial entrepreneur who piloted first solo circumnavigation by helicopter, and founded by him:
Dick Smith (retailer), a former Australian electronics retail company founded by the entrepreneur
Dick Smith Foods, Australian food brand, created by the entrepreneur
Dick Smith (make-up artist) (1922–2014), make-up artist
Dick Smith (software), software engineer, computer consultant and science fiction fanzine publisher
Dick Smith, Idaho state senator who ran for the Republican nomination for governor in 1970
Dick Smith Wizzard, the name of the hybrid computer and home video game console VTech CreatiVision in Australia and New Zealand

See also
Richard Smith (disambiguation)
Rick Smith (disambiguation)
Dick King-Smith (1922–2011), author